A wetdown is a ritual celebrated by many volunteer fire departments in the United States in which squads of firefighters from neighboring towns ritualistically commission a new fire apparatus by anointing it with water sprayed from the visitors' firefighting equipment.

If two new apparatus' are commissioned, then it is considered to be a "Double Wetdown". If three new apparatus' are commissioned, then it is called a "Triple Wetdown". Or if four new apparatus' are commissioned, then it is considered as a "Quadruple Wetdown".

History 
The tradition dates back to the late 1800s, when fire departments used horses to pull a fire apparatus to fires. After fighting the fire, the crews would wash and ready the horses and the apparatus in preparation for the next call, then they would push the apparatus into the station's bay.

Wetdown at present 

 Princeton Fire-Rescue — July 9, 2021.
 Paducah Fire Department — August 31, 2020
 Lynchburg Fire Department — March 11, 2020
 Amarillo Fire Department — October 08, 2018
 Plano's Fire Station 2 — April 26, 2018

References

External links 
 Handleman, Lillian R. "Wet Down Held for New Fire Truck", ReminderNews, 2 December 2008. 
 "Truckin' in Fair Haven" Red Bank Green, 15 June 2009.
 "Dedication and Wet-down of Engine 35-2, Kinderhook Fire Department, 11 September 2005.
Norfolk, CT Engine 40 Wetdown July 25, 2009.
The Fast Fire Watch

Ceremonies
Firefighting